AltSounds is a video streaming site. It began as an Internet publication devoted to music criticism and commentary, music news, and artist interviews. Its focus is on alternative music. In 2015 it changed format to providing video playlists only.

History
The website was originally created in 2004 by editor-in-chief Chris "MUG5" Maguire. AltSounds published content from different contributors including, academics and professional journalists to career professionals and first time writers. It included news, interviews, record reviews, as well competitions.

In June 2008, the website formed a record label, Altsounds Records, signing Winch House as their first act. In November 2012, AltSounds was added to the list of ratings sources of AnyDecentMusic?. In 2015, the format of the magazine format was changed to video streaming only. In 2016, Maguire founded the creative marketing agency RIOT.

References

External links

2004 establishments in the United States
Online music magazines published in the United States
Internet properties established in 2004